Jana Novotná won in the final 7–5, 6–4 against Jana Pospíšilová.

Seeds
A champion seed is indicated in bold text while text in italics indicates the round in which that seed was eliminated.

  Lori McNeil (second round)
  Nicole Provis (second round)
  Radka Zrubáková (semifinals)
  Catarina Lindqvist (quarterfinals)
  Jana Novotná (champion)
  Dianne Balestrat (quarterfinals)
  Beverly Bowes (first round)
  Laura Garrone (first round)

Draw

References
 1988 Southern Cross Classic Draw

1988 Singles
1988 WTA Tour
1988 in Australian tennis